The 1951 Pau Grand Prix was a non-championship Formula One motor race held on 26 March 1951 at the Pau circuit, in Pau, Pyrénées-Atlantiques, France. The Grand Prix was won by Luigi Villoresi, driving the Ferrari 375. Louis Rosier finished second and Giuseppe Farina third.

Classification

Race

References

Pau Grand Prix
Pau
1951 in French motorsport